The Center for Computational Mass Spectrometry (CCMS) is a proteomics center at the University of California, San Diego.

CCMS is the author of mass spectrometry software tools such as InsPecT search engine or PepNovo.

External links
 

University of California, San Diego
Scientific organizations based in the United States
Proteomics